World League Soccer '98 is an association football video game developed by Silicon Dreams Studio.  It was published in May 1998 by Eidos Interactive on the Sony PlayStation and PC, and by Sega on the Sega Saturn.

Reception

Extreme Playstation rated the game a 94 of 100 saying "If you're been sucked by World Cup fever and intend buying a footie sim in the near future, we at EPM strongly recommend this. It's not instantly accessible, so if you want something to just boot up and play- without using any brain-power, purchase a game with a number and an animal in the title. If you're looking for the ultimate footie simulation that taxes your reflexes, stamina, and grey matter, WLS 98, is da maan!

References 

1998 video games
Association football video games
PlayStation (console) games
Sega Saturn games
Video games developed in the United Kingdom
Windows games